Sergius of Radonezh (Sergii Radonezhsky; 14 May 1314 – 25 September 1392), also known as Sergiy Radonezhsky, Serge of Radonezh and Sergius of Moscow, was a spiritual leader and monastic reformer of medieval Russia. Together with Seraphim of Sarov, he is one of the Russian Orthodox Church's most highly venerated saints.

Early life

The date of his birth is unclear: it could be 1314, 1319, or 1322. His medieval biography states that he was born to Kiril and Maria, a boyar family, near Rostov (Yaroslavl Oblast), on the spot where  now stands.

The narrative of Epiphanius does not specify the exact birthplace of the monk, stating only that before the migration from Rostov principality the monk's family lived "in a village in the area, which is within the Rostov principality, not very close to the city of Rostov". It is considered that it is the village Varnitsa near Rostov. Sergius received the baptismal name of Bartholomew (Варѳоломе́й Varfolomei in Russian) in honor of the Apostle Bartholomew.

Although an intelligent boy, Bartholomew had great difficulty learning to read. His biography states that a starets (spiritual elder) met him one day and gave him a piece of prosphora (holy bread) to eat, and from that day forward he was able to read. Orthodox Christians interpret the incident as being an angelic visitation.

When the Principality of Rostov fell into the hands of Prince Ivan Danilovich of the Grand Duchy of Moscow, his parents Kirill and Maria became impoverished and moved to Radonezh together with their three sons, Stefan, Bartholomew and Peter.

Monastic life

Upon his parents' death, Bartholomew went to Khotkovo near Moscow, where his older brother Stefan was a monk. He persuaded Stefan to find a more secluded place to live the ascetic life. In the deep forest at Makovets Hill they decided to build a small monastic cell and a church dedicated in honor of the Trinity. Thus started the history of the great Trinity-St. Sergius Lavra.

In time, Stefan moved to a monastery in Moscow. Varfolomei (Bartholomew) was tonsured a monk and given the name Sergius, following which he spent more than a year in the forest alone as a hermit. Soon, however, other monks started coming to him and building their own cells. After some time, they persuaded him to become their hegumen (abbot) and he was ordained to the priesthood. Following his example, all the monks had to live by their own labor. Over time, more and more monks and donations came to this place. Nearby, there appeared a posad, which grew into the town of Sergiev Posad, and other villages.

When the news of Sergius's accomplishments reached Patriarch Philotheus of Constantinople, Philotheus sent a monastic charter to Sergius. During the reign of Dmitri Donskoi, his disciples started to spread his teaching across central and northern Russia. They settled intentionally in the most impracticable places and founded numerous monasteries, of which Borisoglebsky, Ferapontov, Kirillo-Belozersky and Vysotsky monasteries could be mentioned. Sergius was also connected with the foundation of two monastic communities in Moscow, Andronikov and Simonov monasteries. All in all, the disciples of Sergius founded about 40 monasteries, thus greatly extending the geographical extent of his influence and authority. Metropolitan Alexius, Metropolitan of Moscow asked Sergius to become his successor but Sergius declined, preferring to remain a simple monk rather than be a bishop.

As an ascetic, Sergius did not take part in the political life of the country. However, he blessed Dmitry Donskoy when he went to fight the Tatars in the signal Battle of Kulikovo field, but only after he was certain Dmitry had pursued all peaceful means of resolving the conflict. Some historians interpreted his political stance as aspiring to make peace and unite Russian lands under the leadership of Moscow.

Death and canonization

Sergius died on 25 September 1392. His incorrupt relics were found in 1422 and placed in the new cathedral of Troitse-Sergiyeva Lavra which he founded.

The exact year of his canonization is uncertain, either 1452 or 1448
.The church commemorates him on September 25, the date of his death, and on July 5, the day his relics were uncovered. (See ). Among the many affectionate titles given to him, he has been referred to as the "Abbot of Russia" and "valiant voivod" of the Russian land.

The Catholic Church officially recognizes Sergius. In 1940, he was included in the liturgical calendar authorized for the Russian Catholics.

Sergius is honored in the Calendar of Saints of several churches of the Anglican Communion and is remembered in the Church of England with a commemoration on 25 September.

The ecumenical Fellowship of Saint Alban and Saint Sergius is named in part for him.

In December 1937, Pavel Florensky (1882–1937), a Russian theologian, priest, mathematician, inventor, philosopher and engineer died in the Soviet Gulag and it is thought he was condemned by an extrajudicial NKVD troika under NKVD Order No. 00447 to be executed during the 1930s Bolshevik purges after refusing to disclose the hiding place of Sergius' head which the Bolsheviks wanted destroyed. It is rumored that Florensky and other theologians were involved in a plot to save and hide the relics of St. Sergius. The relics were returned by Pavel Golubtsov, later "Archbishop Sergius", to the cathedral of Troitse-Sergiyeva Lavra in 1946 when it was reopened.

Legacy
Much information about Sergius and his acts is taken from the writing of his life composed in the 15th century, which has come down to us in many later editions in the 15th to 20th century Russian manuscripts. The memory of Sergius of Radonezh has lived on thanks to the unique manuscript entitled "The Life of St. Sergius of Radonezh" written by famous hagiographer Pachomius the Serb, also known as Pachomius Logothetes. The original manuscript is housed in the National Library of Russia.

References

External links

Official site of the Trinity-St. Sergius Lavra
Repose of the Venerable Sergius, Abbot and Wonderworker of Radonezh Orthodox icon and synaxarion
Uncovering of the relics of the Venerable Sergius of Radonezh
IMDB page

1314 births
1392 deaths
14th-century Christian saints
14th-century Christian mystics
Pre-Reformation Anglican saints
Christian ascetics
Russian Eastern Orthodox priests
People from Yaroslavl Oblast
Russian saints of the Eastern Orthodox Church
Russian Orthodox monks
Starets
Miracle workers
Eastern Catholic saints
Russian Roman Catholic saints
14th-century Eastern Orthodox priests
Angelic visionaries
Anglican saints